Ada is a town in the Boripe Local Government area of Osun State, Nigeria. A town headed by Oba Oyetunde Olumuyiwa Ojo (The Olona of Ada), Ada has the biggest market in the local government area and it generated the highest revenue for it. Some of the compounds that make up the town are Ile Oba Oludele, ile oba Adeitan, Ile oba Olugbogbo, Ile Aro, Ile Alagbaa, Ojomu Oteniola, Alade, Eesa, Jagun, Osolo, Oke Baale, Asasile, Oluode, Agba Akin, and Ile Odogun.The people of the town are hospitable, industrious, and hardworking. They value education and are accommodating for citation of any businesses due to their large geographical land expanse yet to be developed. There are hotels and a hospital in the town.

Background
The settlement dates from before the late 19th century. Ada has the biggest market in the local government area Kown as (Obada Market) and it generated the highest revenue for it. Buying and selling takes place every 5 days ,The town is the home of a private golf course that was created by Comfort Olufunke PonnLe and her husband, a prominent estate valuer and philanthropist, Bode Adediji, Late Alalade, one of the first chartered accountants in Nigeria.

Religion
Several Religion is been practiced in the town but Christianity and Islam are the dominants religion in the town, the town has seen a rise in other dominations of Christianity especially the Pentecostal's, Apostolic, Evangelical and others.

Occupations
Ada people ancient occupation is black soap production (Osedudu), And also another main occupation of the town is Farming.

Hotels and Restaurants
Ada also have hotels for visitors and travelers, Hotels in Ada are listed bellow.

 Miccom Golf Hotel
 Royal life Hotel
 Epic Hotel (and others)

Educational institutions
Bellow are the list for notable Educational Institutions including  private and government school in the town. 

Government Schools: 

 Secondary commercial grammar school
 local authority middle school (L.A school)
 Baptist Primary School
 St Andrew Primary School
 Ajayi Memoria High School

And others...

Private Schools:

 Goshen Model college
 El-Shaddai Private school
 Salem Comprehensive high school
 Excel kiddies School

And many more

References

Populated places in Osun State